The 2012 Ukrainian Cup Final was a football match that was played at the Olimpiysky NSC, Kyiv, on 6 May 2012. The match was the 21st Ukrainian Cup Final and was contested by Metalurh Donetsk and Shakhtar Donetsk. This was the first time since 2007 that the Cup final had returned to Kyiv. Since Shakhtar had qualified for the 2012–13 UEFA Champions League, Metalurh would qualify for the 2012–13 UEFA Europa League. In the draw, Metalurh was selected as the home team.

Road to Kyiv 

As Ukrainian Premier League members, Shakhtar Donetsk and Metalurh Donetsk did not have to go through the qualification phase of the competition.

Previous encounters 
This was the first Ukrainian Cup final between the two teams. The two teams had also met in a semi-final in 2009–10 and in the Round of 16 in 1997–98 season in which Metalurh was able to overcome Shakhtar.

Metalurh had appeared only once in a Cup final without winning any trophies and their opponents Shakhtar had appeared in 11 Cup finals, winning seven.

Television 
The match was broadcast on ICTV in Ukraine.

Match

Details

Post-match 
On account of Shakhtar's victory and Metalurh's defeat in the Ukrainian Cup final, and with both team finishing as "good as they could" in the 2011–12 Ukrainian Premier League, the 2012 Ukrainian Super Cup will feature Shakhtar Donetsk and Dynamo Kyiv.

See also
 2011–12 Ukrainian Premier League

References

Cup Final
Ukrainian Cup finals
Ukrainian Cup Final 2012
Ukrainian Cup Final 2012
Ukrainian Cup Final 2012
May 2012 sports events in Ukraine